Thavarasa Kalaiarasan (born 16 April 1970) is a Sri Lankan Tamil politician, former provincial councillor and Member of Parliament.

Kalaiarasan was born on 16 April 1970. He is a member of the Illankai Tamil Arasu Kachchi. He was chairman of Navithanveli Divisional Council.

Kalaiarasan contested the 2012 provincial council election as one of the Tamil National Alliance (TNA) electoral alliance's candidates in Ampara District and was elected to the Eastern Provincial Council (EPC). He contested the 2015 parliamentary election as one of the TNA's candidates in Ampara District but failed to get elected after coming 2nd amongst the TNA candidates. He contested the 2020 parliamentary election as one of the TNA's candidates in Ampara District but the alliance failed to win any seats in the district. However, following the election he was appointed to the Parliament of Sri Lanka as a National List MP representing the TNA.

References

1970 births
Illankai Tamil Arasu Kachchi politicians
Local authority councillors of Sri Lanka
Living people
Members of the 16th Parliament of Sri Lanka
Members of the Eastern Provincial Council
Sri Lankan Hindus
Sri Lankan Tamil politicians
Tamil National Alliance politicians